United States Smith is a 1928 American silent drama film directed by Joseph Henabery and starring Eddie Gribbon, Lila Lee and Kenneth Harlan.

Cast
 Eddie Gribbon as Sgt. Steve Riley 
 Lila Lee as Molly Malone 
 Mickey Bennett as Ugo 
 Kenneth Harlan as Cpl. Jim Sharkey 
 Earle Marsh as Danny

References

Bibliography
 Richard L. Hemenez. The United States Marine Corps in Books and the Performing Arts. McFarland, 2001.

External links
 

1928 films
1928 drama films
1920s English-language films
American silent feature films
Silent American drama films
Films directed by Joseph Henabery
American black-and-white films
Gotham Pictures films
1920s American films
English-language drama films